A circular rampart (German: Ringwall) is an embankment built in the shape of a circle that was used as part of the defences for a military fortification, hill fort or refuge, or was built for religious purposes or as a place of gathering.

The period during which these structures were built ranged from the Neolithic to the Middle Ages.

Construction

The key feature of a circular rampart is that the embankment formed the primary element of the defensive fortification. It can be constructed in various ways: as a simple earth embankment, as a wood and earth structure, or as a wall. Circular ramparts usually have a moat or ditch in front of them; the embankment can be enhanced with a wooden palisade. Often several concentric rings were built, which produced a more effective defensive position against attackers. The interior of such sites often shows evidence of buildings such as halls, barns, and other secondary structures.

Locations

Circular ramparts are found in north and western Europe, for example, in Denmark, Estonia, Sweden, Germany, Great Britain, Belgium and the Netherlands; in central Europe, in Austria and Switzerland; in southeastern Europe in Romania, Moldova and Ukraine; and also in the United States. They are often hidden in woods and discovered by aerial photography. Archaeological profiles through the defences and excavations of the interior enable analysis of the period the site was occupied, the pottery used and the type of food consumed.

Notable circular ramparts

 Viale Beatrice d'Este, Milan, italy
 Aggersborg, near Aggersund, Denmark
 Circular rampart of Burg, near Celle, Lower Saxony, Germany
 The Donnersberg, near Rockenhausen, Rhineland-Palatinate, Germany
 Castle Dore, Cornwall, England
 Fyrkat, Denmark
 Gråborg, built in stages between years 500–1100, Öland, Sweden
 The Heidenmauer near Bad Dürkheim, Germany
 Nanih Waiya, a Choctaw mound, Winston County, USA
 The circular rampart at Old Basing, Hampshire, England
 Celtic circular wall of Otzenhausen, Saarland, Germany
 Saxon rampart on the Marienberg near Nordstemmen, Germany
 Viking ring fortress of Trelleborg, Sweden

Varbola Stronghold largest circular rampart fortress built in Estonia (10th – 12th century)

See also

References

Literature
 Orser, Charles E., Encyclopedia of historical archaeology,  Routledge, 11 April 2002, 
 Shoemaker, Nancy, American Indians, WileyBlackwell, 1 October 2000,

External links
 Trelleborg circular fortress in Denmark
 Castle Dore in Cornwall, England
 Old Basing, Hampshire, England

Archaeological sites
Fortifications by type
Stone Age
Medieval defences